Peeper is a 1975 American mystery comedy film directed by Peter Hyams and starring Michael Caine as Leslie C. Tucker, a bungling private investigator. It was a send-up of 1940s film noir. Peeper was a box-office failure that jeopardized Hyams's career and almost prevented him from obtaining funding to produce Capricorn One.

Plot
The film is set in Los Angeles in 1947. A criminal on the run from hired killers comes to the office of a private detective named Tucker and asks Tucker to find a daughter he left at an orphanage in 1918. The man has a substantial amount of money that he wants to give the girl. Tucker's search leads him to two sisters, daughters of a rich Beverly Hills widow. Tucker is sure one of the sisters is the man's daughter, but he's not sure which is the right one. Meanwhile, the killers chasing Tucker's client are now chasing the detective, and Tucker also discovers that the widow's brother-in-law may be blackmailing the two girls and/or embezzling from the widow. Tucker also keeps encountering a mysterious stranger who seems to know more than he admits, and may or may not be working with the brother-in-law. Ultimately everyone ends up on a cruise ship headed to South America and the various mysteries are resolved.

Cast

Production
The film originally was titled Fat Chance and began filming in June 1974. The producers had worked with Peter Hyams on Busting and hired him to rewrite W.D. Richter's script and direct because they liked the comic elements of Busting.

Reception
Hyams said he "managed to combine critical and commercial failure. And that made me colder than ice. Nobody wanted me."

References

External links
 
 
 
 
 

1975 films
1975 comedy films
American comedy mystery films
1970s comedy mystery films
American detective films
Films based on American novels
Films directed by Peter Hyams
Films set in 1947
Films set in Los Angeles
Films with screenplays by W. D. Richter
Films produced by Robert Chartoff
Films produced by Irwin Winkler
1970s English-language films
1970s American films